Massagist is a 2015 horror film directed by Taweewat Wantha. A Chinese-Thai co-production, the film was released in China on December 31, 2015.

Plot
Chinese girl Moran (Yuan Bai Zi Hui) lost her mother during childhood, but her sudden bizarre death has always been a mystery, which left her heartbroken. Having moved to Thailand, eighteen year-old Moran is perplexed by a variety of bizarre deaths that occur one after another in massage parlours, making her mother’s death even more complicated and confusing.

Meanwhile, Thai policeman (Huang Kaijie) has led an in-depth investigation, discovering that the people who died are inextricably linked. Layers of mystery finally expose a cover-up and the shocking truth…

Cast
Bowie Lam
Yuan Baizihui
Jack Kao
Wesley Wong
Niu Weiqi
Gao Xiang
Ye Yong

Reception
The film grossed  on its opening in China.

References

2010s Mandarin-language films
Thai-language films
Chinese horror films
Thai horror films
2015 horror films
Chinese multilingual films
Thai multilingual films
Chinese supernatural horror films
Thai supernatural horror films
2015 multilingual films